Benedicta Margaretha von Löwendal (1683-1776), was a German business person. She founded and managed an iron works on her estate Mückenberg from 1725 until 1776 and became the greatest entrepreneur in Niederlausitz. A street and a college in Lauchhammer, the Freifrau-von-Löwendal-Gymnasium, were named after her.

References

 

18th-century German businesspeople
1683 births
1776 deaths
German ironmasters
18th-century ironmasters